The Airtime Discovery is an Australian paramotor that was designed and produced by Airtime Products of Airlie Beach, Queensland for powered paragliding. Now out of production, when it was available the aircraft was supplied complete and ready-to-fly.

Design and development
The Discovery was designed to comply with the US FAR 103 Ultralight Vehicles rules as well as Australian and European regulations. It features a paraglider-style wing, single-place accommodation and a single engine in pusher configuration. The aircraft is built from a combination of aluminium including an aluminium chassis that can be broken down into four parts for transport.

The Discovery originally used the Radne Raket 120 engine, but this was replaced by larger engines, due to insufficient power output.

As is the case with all paramotors, take-off and landing is accomplished by foot. Inflight steering is accomplished via handles that actuate the canopy brakes, creating roll and yaw.

Variants
Discovery C100
Model with a  Cors'Air M21Y engine with a 2.6:1 ratio reduction drive and a  diameter two-bladed composite, fixed-pitch propeller.
Discovery C122
Model with a  Cors'Air M21Y engine with a 2.6:1 ratio reduction drive and a  diameter two-bladed composite, fixed-pitch propeller.
Discovery T125
 Per Il Volo Top 80 engine with a 3:1 ratio reduction drive and a  diameter two-bladed composite, fixed-pitch propeller.

Specifications (Discovery C100)

See also
Airtime Explorer

References

Discovery
2000s Australian ultralight aircraft
Single-engined pusher aircraft
Paramotors